Konstantinos "Kostas" Mavridis (born 7 July 1962) is a former Greek international footballer.

Career
Mavridis started his career from Athinaikos and he played with his club in amateur leagues until 1982. Mavridis was transferred to Panathiakos in 1982.Until 1985 he was playing as a forward. His coach Jacek Gmoch moved him to the defence in a game  against Liverpool for the semifinals for 1984–85 European Cup.

References

External links

1962 births
Living people
Greek footballers
Greece international footballers
Association football midfielders
Super League Greece players
Panathinaikos F.C. players
Apollon Smyrnis F.C. players